Pace is the suburban bus and regional paratransit division of the Regional Transportation Authority in the Chicago metropolitan area.  It was created in 1983 by the RTA Act, which established the formula that provides funding to the Chicago Transit Authority (CTA), Metra, and Pace. The various agencies providing bus service in the Chicago suburbs were merged under the Suburban Bus Division, which rebranded as Pace in 1984. In 2013, Pace had 39.925 million riders. Pace is not an acronym, but a marketing name.

Pace's headquarters are in Arlington Heights, Illinois.  Pace is governed by a 13-member Board of Directors, 12 of which are current and former suburban mayors, with the other being the Commissioner of the Chicago Mayor's Office for People with Disabilities, to represent the city's paratransit riders.

History 
In 2011, Pace received its first diesel-electric hybrid buses from Orion Bus Industries, two years before Orion folded. These Orion VII 3G buses are the first buses in the Pace fleet to not be powered directly by diesel. In 2015, Pace received its first fleet of compressed natural gas buses from ElDorado National, these buses operate mainly in the southern suburbs.

Service area
The six counties that Pace serves are Cook, Lake, Will, Kane, McHenry, and DuPage.  Some of Pace's bus routes also go to Chicago and Indiana.  In some areas, notably Evanston, River Forest, Oak Park, and Skokie, both Pace and the Chicago Transit Authority provide service.

Many of Pace's route terminals are located at CTA rail stations and bus terminals and Metra stations.  The CTA and Pace have shared a payment system since 2014 called Ventra.  Ventra accounts are required to obtain transfers.  In 2015, Metra was added to the Ventra app.

Pace buses generally have longer routes than CTA buses.  Due to its geographic service area, service is provided by eleven operating divisions (see below), as well as under agreements with several municipalities and private operators (school bus and motor coach companies). Pace buses provide service from the suburbs to various special events in the city, such as Routes 282 and 779 for Chicago Cubs games, Routes 773, 774 and 775 for Chicago White Sox games, Routes 236, 768, 769 and 776 for Chicago Bears games, Route 222 provides extra service to the Allstate Arena in Rosemont for events scheduled there, Route 284 to Six Flags Great America, Route 387 for events at SeatGeek Stadium in Bridgeview.

Services

Pace Bus 
The majority of Pace bus routes run daily, seven days a week. Other routes run Monday through Saturday, weekdays only, or weekday rush hours only. One route, 352 Halsted, runs 24 hours a day/7 days a week, and four routes 390, 392, 395 and 890, run only for weekday UPS shifts changes.

During weekday rush hours, Pace buses are authorized to use the shoulder of the Jane Addams Memorial Tollway, Edens Expressway, and Stevenson Expressway to avoid traffic congestion.

Pace Pulse 
Pace began operating a new rapid transit service between the Jefferson Park Transit Center and Golf Mill Shopping Center on August 11, 2019. The new Pulse service overlaps with part of Pace route 270 which saw a reduction in the route's service frequency. An additional Pace Pulse line is underway on Dempster St, spanning Evanston and Skokie and terminating at O’Hare Airport.

I-90 Express 

In December 2016, Pace began an on-highway BRT express bus service between Rosemont Transportation Center and Elgin on the Jane Addams Memorial Tollway. The service uses "flex lanes" to avoid traffic and features train station like stops.

ADA services 
Pace is responsible for ADA paratransit service in its service area, and, effective July 1, 2006, for paratransit service in Chicago.  Pace also coordinates various Dial-a-Ride projects, usually sponsored by various municipalities and townships.  One of the largest is Ride DuPage, sponsored by Du Page County Human Services. All Pace buses are wheelchair accessible and have racks accommodating one bicycle, available during all hours of operation. Pace claims itself as the nation's largest paratransit service provider, providing approximately 17,000 daily trips on paratransit, dial-a-ride and ADvAntage vanpools.

Vanpool incentive program 
Pace operates a Vanpool Incentive Program, where groups save by commuting together in a van owned and maintained by Pace and driven by one of the participants.  There is also a Municipal Vanpool Program, under which Pace provides a van to a municipality, for any public transportation purpose (such as demand response service for senior citizens).

Operational structure 
Given Pace's large service area, it is broken up into eleven operating divisions. Additionally, Niles, Highland Park and Schaumburg operate routes on behalf of Pace.

Bus fleet 

 Individual units in a series may be retired or out of service (also, a few units in a mostly retired series might still be operating).
 No buses with fleet numbers ending in 13 (20400–20485 consists of 85 buses, and there is no 20413).
 Some routes operated with paratransit or community vehicles.
 Announced on 4/5/2022: Proterra won a $26.5M contract from Pace Suburban Bus to deliver 20 Proterra ZX5 Max electric transit buses (675kWh battery) and EV fleet charging infrastructure, with the first electric bus delivery in 2023.

References

External links
 Pace Suburban Bus website

1983 establishments in Illinois
Bus transportation in Illinois
Regional Transportation Authority (Illinois)
Transportation in Chicago
Transportation in Cook County, Illinois
Transportation in Lake County, Illinois
Transportation in Will County, Illinois
Transportation in Kane County, Illinois
Transportation in McHenry County, Illinois
Transportation in DuPage County, Illinois
Transit agencies in Illinois